Applewhite is a surname. Notable people with the surname include:

Antwan Applewhite (born 1985), football player
Ashton Applewhite (born 1952), writer and activist
Charlie Applewhite (1932–2001), singer
James Applewhite (born 1935), poet
Major Applewhite (born 1978), football coach
Marshall Applewhite (1931–1997), cult leader

Fictional characters:
Betty Applewhite, Desperate Housewives character

See also
Surviving the Applewhites, novel
Isaac Applewhite House, historic site
Ward-Applewhite-Thompson House, historic site
W. H. Applewhite House, historic site